Marisol Bretón López (born 13 January 1975) is a Mexican archer. She competed in the women's individual event at the 1996 Summer Olympics.

References

External links
 

1975 births
Living people
Mexican female archers
Olympic archers of Mexico
Archers at the 1996 Summer Olympics
Place of birth missing (living people)
Pan American Games medalists in archery
Pan American Games silver medalists for Mexico
Pan American Games bronze medalists for Mexico
Archers at the 1995 Pan American Games
Archers at the 2003 Pan American Games
Medalists at the 1995 Pan American Games
Medalists at the 2003 Pan American Games
20th-century Mexican women